Harmonization is the process of minimizing redundant or conflicting standards which may have evolved independently. The name is also an analogy to the process to harmonizing discordant music.

Harmonization is different from standardization. Harmonization involves a reduction in variation of standards, while standardization entails moving towards the eradication of any variation with the adoption of a single standard. The goal for standard harmonization is to find commonalities, identify critical requirements that need to be retained, and provide a common framework for standards setting organizations (SSO) to adopt. In some instances, businesses come together forming alliances or coalitions, also referred to multi-stakeholder initiatives (MSI) with a belief that harmonization could reduce compliance costs and simplify the process of meeting requirements. With potential to reduce complexity for those tasked with testing and auditing standards for compliance.

Harmonization in the Public Sector

A harmonised standard is a European standard developed by a recognised European Standards Organisation: European Committee for Standardization (CEN), European Committee for Electrotechnical Standardization (CENELEC), or European Telecommunications Standards Institute (ETSI). It is created following a request from the European Commission to one of these organisations. Harmonised standards must be published in the Official Journal of the European Union (OJEU).

In the information and communication technologies (ICT) sector, companies initially formed closed groups to develop private standards, for reasons which included competitive advantage. An example being the phrase "embrace, extend, and extinguish" used internally by Microsoft which led to legal action taken by United States Department of Justice. In response, governments and intergovernmental organizations (IGOs) recommended the use of international standards which resulted in standard harmonization. Examples include the Linux operating system, Adobe portable document format (PDF) and the OASIS open document format (ODF) being converted into ISO and IEC international standards. In 2022, EU legislation was passed for all mobile phones, tablets and cameras sold in the EU requiring a USB-C charging port by 2024. The USB Type-C Specification is an IEC international standard, IEC 62680-1-3.

Harmonization of regulatory standards is seen by economists as a key component in reducing trade costs and increasing interstate trade. The US Government Office of Management and Budget published CircularA-119 instructing its agencies to adopt voluntary consensus standards before relying upon private standards. The circular mandates standard harmonization by eliminating or reducing US agency use of private standards and government standards. The priority for governments to adopt voluntary consensus standards is supported by international standards such as ISO supporting public policy initiatives.

See also
De facto standard
European Committee for Electrotechnical Standardization
European Committee for Standardization
European Telecommunications Standards Institute
Harmonisation of law
International Standard
Standardization
Standards organization
Tax harmonization
Technical Standard

References

External links
Vocabulary and RIM Harmonization Process from Health Level 7 (HL7)
Harmonizing Standards from UL
Why Standards Harmonization is Essential to Web Accessibility, W3C
Harmonised Standards, OJEU
Harmonization, James A. Thomas, ASTM Standards News, March 2005

Harmony
Standards
Technical communication
Technical specifications